David Christopher Padgett (born February 13, 1985) is an American former basketball coach and player.  As a college basketball player, he had played for the Kansas Jayhawks before transferring and finishing his career at Louisville.

High school
Born  in Reno, Nevada, Padgett attended Reno High School, where he averaged 27 points and 14 rebounds per game his senior year.  He was a McDonald's High School and a first-team Parade All-American.  He also was a member of the 2004 USA Basketball Junior World Championship Qualifying Team, earning a gold medal at the event.

As a high school senior, he was the top-rated center and considered the fourth-rated prospect overall by Inside Hoops, the seventh overall by Rivals Hoops, and fifteenth overall by ESPN.com.  In 2003, he was the Nevada player of the year.

College career

Kansas (2003–2004) 
Padgett committed to the University of Kansas in 2003 in Roy Williams' last season as the head coach.  He decided to remain at Kansas after Williams left for the University of North Carolina and Bill Self became the head coach. His most memorable moment at Kansas came when he made the game winning shot in an 84-82 victory against Missouri in what turned out to be the last basketball game at the Hearnes Center.

Louisville (2005–2008) 
After his freshman year, Padgett decided to transfer to the University of Louisville. NCAA rules dictated that he redshirted and would sit out for the 2004-2005 season, during which the Cardinals made it to the Final Four.

Padgett served as team captain with Taquan Dean. His team debut against Prairie View A&M was the third-highest scoring debut of any Cardinal at 17 points.  He scored a career-high 27 points and eight rebounds against UConn.

Padgett scored in double-figures in 14 games in the 2006-2007 season.  The Cardinals' leader in field goal percentage (59.7%, fourth in the Big East Conference), Padgett averaged 9.5 points and 5.6 rebounds per game. He was named to the All-Big East Conference Second Team.

At the beginning of his senior year, Padgett broke his kneecap in the season opener against Jackson State.  He recovered quicker than expected and rejoined the team against Cincinnati on January 1, 2008.  Padgett was a unanimous first-team selection for All-Big East.

Padgett's final year with Louisville came to end in the Elite Eight of the 2008 NCAA Men's Division I Basketball Tournament.  Though the #3 Cardinals lost to the #1 Tar Heels 83-73, Padgett was the Cardinals' top all around performer, finishing the game with 6 points, 8 rebounds, and 6 assists.

Professional career
Though undrafted by an NBA team, Padgett was signed on July 2, 2008 by the Miami Heat, and added to its summer league team.  However, Padgett was waived by the Heat on October 26, 2008.

After spending the 2008-09 season in Spain, Padgett was named to the Portland Trail Blazers 2009 summer league team.  However, Padgett was not invited to training camp, and proceeded to play the next year in Spain with U.B. La Palma.

Coaching career
Following his second season in Spain, Padgett unofficially retired and returned to Louisville as the team's assistant strength coach, working under his former head coach Rick Pitino. After spending the 2010–11 season in that position, he left to become a full-time assistant at IUPUI, serving in that role until IUPUI head coach Todd Howard was fired at the end of the 2013–14 season.

Padgett then returned to the Louisville program, and was initially hired in the 2014 offseason as assistant video coordinator. Shortly after he was hired at U of L, he was promoted to director of basketball operations when Andre McGee left to become an assistant with UMKC. Padgett was promoted to an assistant coach position at U of L, in March 2015.

Padgett was named acting head coach at Louisville on September 29, 2017, amid FBI investigations of various basketball programs that ultimately led to the firings of both Pitino and athletic director Tom Jurich.

Following Louisville's loss in the NIT, they announced that Padgett would not be retained as head coach.

Head coaching record

College

Personal
Padgett's father, Pete, played for the University of Nevada, his uncle played for the University of New Mexico, his grandfather, Jim, played for Oregon State, and his sister, Melissa, played for the University of San Diego.

He has a wife, Megan, and two sons, Nolan and Gavin. He resides in Louisville.

Padgett left coaching following the 2017-18 season and now works as a financial advisor for Morgan Stanley in Louisville. He also serves as a commentator for college basketball telecasts on ESPN.

References

External links

 IUPUI coach bio
 Player bio at the University of Louisville
 'Sheriff' Padgett keying Louisville's surge

1985 births
Living people
American expatriate basketball people in Spain
American men's basketball coaches
American men's basketball players
Basketball coaches from Nevada
Basketball players from Nevada
CB Canarias players
Centers (basketball)
IUPUI Jaguars men's basketball coaches
Kansas Jayhawks men's basketball players
Louisville Cardinals men's basketball coaches
Louisville Cardinals men's basketball players
McDonald's High School All-Americans
Parade High School All-Americans (boys' basketball)
Sportspeople from Reno, Nevada
UB La Palma players